Dirty Hands is a 1948 play by Jean-Paul Sartre

Dirty Hands or Dirty hands may also refer to:
Dirty hands, a concept in moral and political philosophy
 Dirty hands doctrine, an equitable defense in contract law
Dirty Hands (2008 drama film), an American political film
Dirty Hands: The Art and Crimes of David Choe, a 2008 American documentary film
"Dirty Hands" (Battlestar Galactica), an episode of Battlestar Galactica
Les innocents aux mains sales or Dirty Hands, a 1975 West German film
"Dirty Hands", a song by Black Lips

See also
Clean hands (disambiguation)
Dirty Hand, a silent film starring Ben Alexander